Statistics of Japanese Regional Leagues for the 1986 season.

Champions list

League standings

Hokkaido

Tohoku

Kanto

Hokushinetsu

Tokai

Kansai

Chūgoku

Shikoku

Kyushu

1986
Jap
Jap
3